The 2011–12 Evansville IceMen season was the second season of the Central Hockey League (CHL) franchise in Evansville, Indiana.

Regular season

Conference standings

Awards and records

Awards

Milestones

Transactions 
The IceMen have been involved in the following transactions during the 2011–12 season.

Free agents acquired

Free agents lost

Players re-signed

Lost via retirement

Roster 

|}

See also 
 2011–12 CHL season

References

External links 
 2011–12 Evansville IceMen season at Pointstreak

E
E